Karalundi is a medium-sized Aboriginal community, located 60 km north of Meekatharra in the Mid West region of Western Australia, within the Shire of Meekatharra.

Native title 

The community is located within the registered Wajarri Yamatji (WAD6033/98) native title claim area.

Education 

Children of school age at Karalundi attend the Karalundi Aboriginal Education Community campus. It is a co-educational school catering for students K – 10. All students at the school are boarders. Students are resident only during the school term and return to their communities for holiday periods.

Town planning 

Karalundi Layout Plan No.1 has been prepared in accordance with State Planning Policy 3.2 Aboriginal Settlements. Layout Plan No.1 was endorsed by the community on 19 February 2007 and the Western Australian Planning Commission on 13 November 2007.

References

External links 
 Community education program
 Native Title Claimant application summary

Towns in Western Australia
Aboriginal communities in Mid West (Western Australia)
Shire of Meekatharra